Trifolium pannonicum is a species of clover known by the common name Hungarian Clover.

Description
Trifolium pannonicum is a perennial non-climbing clump-forming herb with lanceolate, dark green leaves. It bears ovoid spike inflorescences of cream or pale yellow flowers, about 2.5 cm long, blooming in late Spring and mid Summer.

Distribution
This species is native to Albania, Bulgaria, Croatia, France, Germany, Greece, Hungary, Italy, Moldova, Poland, Romania, Serbia, Slovakia, Turkey and Ukraine.

References

External links

 ILDIS
 Agro Atlas
 Shoot Gardening

pannonicum